This page lists the World Best Year Performances in the year 2001 in the Marathon for both men and women. One of the main events during this season were the 2001 IAAF World Championships in Edmonton, Alberta, Canada, where the men's competition was held on August 3, 2001. The women had their race on Sunday August 12, 2001.

Men

Records

2001 World Year Ranking

Women

Records

2001 World Year Ranking

References
2001 Marathon Ranking by the ARRS
IAAF (men)
IAAF (women)

2001
 Marathon